Washington State Magazine is the alumni and research magazine of Washington State University. Published quarterly, the magazine covers news and issues of interest to Washington State University faculty, staff, students, alumni, and the people of Washington.
The magazine was first published in 2001. Before Washington State Magazine, WSU alumni news was published in HillTopics from 1969 to 2000, and The PowWow, the alumni magazine from 1910 to 1969. Research news at the university appeared in Universe magazine in the 1990s.

Online 
All stories from the print magazine are available online at magazine.wsu.edu with supplemental "web extra" media including articles and video. Self-posted class notes (My Story) for WSU alumni can also be found there, as well as a wiki-format informal history of Washington State University (Our Story). The print magazine can be read online via web streaming and/or PDF download.

Awards 
Washington State Magazine has won awards in writing, design, and photography from the Council for Advancement and Support of Education (CASE), an international organization that promotes excellence in educational advancement through alumni relations, communications, marketing, and fund-raising. 
Its most recent awards include: CASE International Circle of Excellence silver award for cover design (Summer 2014); CASE Region VIII grand gold awards for best general interest magazine (2013 & 2011); CASE International Circle of Excellence award for "Photographer of the Year" in 2011 (Zach Mazur).

References

External links 
 Washington State Magazine

Alumni magazines
Quarterly magazines published in the United States
Magazines established in 2001
Magazines published in Washington (state)
Washington State University
2001 establishments in Washington (state)